Enoch H. Williams (June 21, 1927 – April 24, 2012) was an American politician who served in the New York City Council from 1978 to 1997.

He died on April 24, 2012, in Heathrow, Florida at age 84.

References

1927 births
2012 deaths
New York City Council members
New York (state) Democrats